Ilia Eloshvili (19 May 1975 – 1 June 2022) was a Georgian politician. He served as Minister of Energy from September to November 2016 and again from July to December 2017. 

Eloshvili died in Tbilisi on 1 June 2022 at the age of 47.

References

1975 births
2022 deaths
21st-century politicians from Georgia (country)
Energy ministers of Georgia
Politicians from Tbilisi
Georgian Technical University alumni